Cyllopsis is a genus of satyrid butterflies found in the Neotropical realm. The genus was erected by Rudolf Felder in 1869.

Species
Listed alphabetically:
Cyllopsis argentella (Butler & H. Druce, 1872)
Cyllopsis caballeroi Beutelspacher, 1982
Cyllopsis clinas (Godman & Salvin, 1889)
Cyllopsis diazi Miller, 1974
Cyllopsis dospassosi Miller, [1969]
Cyllopsis emilia Chacon & Nishida, 2002
Cyllopsis gemma (Hübner, 1808)
Cyllopsis guatemalena Miller, 1974
Cyllopsis hedemanni R. Felder, 1869
Cyllopsis hilaria (Godman, [1901])
Cyllopsis jacquelinae Miller, 1974
Cyllopsis nayarit (Chermock, 1947)
Cyllopsis nelsoni (Godman & Salvin, [1881])
Cyllopsis pallens Miller, 1974
Cyllopsis parvimaculata Miller, 1974
Cyllopsis pephredo (Godman, [1901])
Cyllopsis perplexa Miller, 1974
Cyllopsis pertepida (Dyar, 1912)
Cyllopsis philodice (Godman & Salvin, 1878)
Cyllopsis pseudopephredo (Chermock, 1947)
Cyllopsis pyracmon (Butler, 1867)
Cyllopsis rogersi (Godman & Salvin, 1878)
Cyllopsis schausi Miller, 1974
Cyllopsis steinhauserorum Miller, 1974
Cyllopsis suivalenoides Miller, 1974
Cyllopsis suivalens Dyar, 1914
Cyllopsis tomemmeli Warren & Nakahara, 2018
Cyllopsis wellingi Miller, 1978
Cyllopsis whiteorum Miller & Maza, 1984
Cyllopsis windi Miller, 1974

References

Euptychiina
Nymphalidae of South America
Butterfly genera
Taxa named by Rudolf Felder